The Central District of Andika County is a district (bakhsh) in Andika County, Khuzestan Province, Iran. At the 2006 census, its population was 18,349, in 3,177 families. The district has one city, Qaleh-ye Khvajeh, and two rural districts (dehestan): Qaleh-ye Khvajeh Rural District and Shalal and Dasht-e Gol Rural District.

References 

Andika County
Districts of Khuzestan Province